The Carrollton Open was a golf tournament on the LPGA Tour from 1950 to 1955. It was played at the Sunset Hills Country Club in Carrollton, Georgia.

Winners
Carrollton Open
1955 Betsy Rawls

Carrollton Georgia Open
1954 Louise Suggs

Carrollton Tournament
1952 Betsy Rawls

Carrollton Georgia Open
1951 Louise Suggs

Sunset Hills Open
1950 Patty Berg

References

Former LPGA Tour events
Golf in Georgia (U.S. state)
Recurring sporting events established in 1950
Recurring events disestablished in 1955
1950 establishments in Georgia (U.S. state)
1955 disestablishments in Georgia (U.S. state)
History of women in Georgia (U.S. state)